Indomitrella is a genus of sea snails, marine gastropod mollusks in the family Columbellidae, the dove snails.

Species
 within the genus Indomitrella include :
 † Indomitrella acuticonica Harzhauser, Raven & Landau, 2018 
 Indomitrella concalis K. Monsecour & D. Monsecour, 2016
 Indomitrella conspersa (Gaskoin, 1851)
 Indomitrella drivasi K. Monsecour & D. Monsecour, 2016
 Indomitrella erronea K. Monsecour & D. Monsecour, 2016
 Indomitrella exsanguis K. Monsecour & D. Monsecour, 2016
 Indomitrella haziersensis Drivas & Jay, 1990
 † Indomitrella mawsoni (Ladd, 1972) 
 Indomitrella puella (G. B. Sowerby I, 1844)
 Indomitrella schepmani (K. Monsecour & D. Monsecour, 2007)
 Indomitrella strongae K. Monsecour & D. Monsecour, 2016
 * brought into synonymy
 Indomitrella kilburni Drivas & Jay, 1990: synonym of Mitrella spiratella (Martens, 1880)

References

Deep-water Columbellidae (Mollusca: Gastropoda) from New Caledonia, in HEROS V., STRONG E. & BOUCHET P. (eds), Tropical Deep-Sea Benthos 29. Mémoires du Muséum national d'Histoire naturelle 208: 291-362

External links

Columbellidae